Following the 2021 Israel–Palestine crisis, the United Nations Human Rights Council voted on 27 May 2021 to set up a United Nations fact-finding mission to investigate possible war crimes and other abuses committed in Israel and the occupied Palestinian territories.

Mission members
Navi Pillay (South Africa), serves as chair, Miloon Kothari (India) and Chris Sidoti (Australia) serve as members of the commission.

Mandate
The commission will report to the Human Rights Council annually from June 2022. Unlike previous fact finding missions the inquiry is open ended and will examine "all underlying root causes of recurrent tensions, instability and protraction of conflict, including systematic discrimination and repression based on national, ethnic, racial or religious identity."
Manpower was reduced from 24 to 18 persons following a US-Israel campaign to reduce the Commission budget. On 17 February 2022, Israel said it will not cooperate with the commission, alleging bias. At the end of March, 68 US senators signed a letter to Secretary of State Antony Blinken calling for the Biden administration to use its influence to quash the inquiry.

Reports
The first report was released on 7 June 2022. The report said that ending the occupation would be insufficient. It said that the root cause of the problems lay in "perpetual occupation" with no intent to end it and that Israel wanted "complete control" over the occupied area. Israel refused access to Israel or the Palestinian territories, Palestinian and Israeli testimony was collected in Geneva and Jordan.  Israel’s Foreign Ministry and the U.S State department rejected the report as biased. When the report was formally presented to the 50th session of the Human Rights Council on 13 June 2022, the United States representative read out a statement objecting to the mandate given to the Committee, saying that it was unfair scrutiny of Israel. Including the United States and Israel, twenty-two countries, most not UNHRC members, signed the statement. Addressing the Council, Navi Pillay said "Given a clear refusal by Israel to take concrete measures to implement the findings and recommendations of past commissions, the international community must urgently explore new ways of ensuring compliance with international law." She also criticized the Palestinian Authority for its failure to hold legislative and Presidential elections and leaders in Gaza for their failure to uphold human rights standards.

On 20 October 2022, the commission released a report to the United Nations General Assembly, calling on the Security Council to end Israel’s "permanent occupation" and on individual UN member states to prosecute Israeli officials. The report found "reasonable grounds" to conclude that the occupation "is now unlawful under international law due to its permanence" and Israel's "de-facto annexation policies." The commission has requested that an International Court of Justice advisory opinion declaring the occupation illegal be obtained. Israeli prime minister Yair Lapid said the report is "biased, false, inciting and blatantly unbalanced" and tweeted that "Not all criticism of Israel is anti-Semitism, but this report was written by anti-Semites … and is a distinctly anti-Semitic report".

See also
 International Criminal Court investigation in Palestine
 Legality of the Israeli occupation of Palestine

References

External links
The United Nations Independent International Commission of Inquiry on the Occupied Palestinian Territory, including East Jerusalem, and Israel

Israeli–Palestinian conflict and the United Nations
United Nations commissions